HMS Deane was a  , originally to be built for the U.S. Navy as a . Before she was finished in 1943, she was transferred to the Royal Navy under the terms of Lend-Lease, and saw service during World War II.

Constructed by the Bethlehem-Hingham Shipyard Inc. in Massachusetts, and was assigned with the hull number DE-86 but no name. The warship was launched on 29 September 1943 and was commissioned into the Royal Navy on 26 November of that year. She served for three years with the British as HMS Deane, and operated mainly in British waters and escorting Arctic convoys. The frigate was also one of the ships tasked with escorting and overseeing the surrender of German U-boats at the end of the war.  She was returned to the US Navy on 4 March 1946, and then sold for scrapping on 7 November 1946.

References
 
 HMS Deane at Uboat.net

 

Captain-class frigates
Buckley-class destroyer escorts
World War II frigates of the United Kingdom
Ships built in Hingham, Massachusetts
1943 ships